The 1997 Big Sky Conference men's basketball tournament was the 22nd edition, held March 6–8 at the Walkup Skydome at Northern Arizona University in Flagstaff, Arizona.

Second-seeded Montana defeated sixth-seeded  in the championship game,  to clinch their third Big Sky tournament title. Northridge had upset host and top-seed Northern Arizona in the semifinals.

Format
In the summer of 1996, longtime Big Sky members Idaho (1963) and Boise State (1970) departed for the Big West, and three new teams were added: Cal State Northridge, Portland State, and Sacramento State. Northridge and Sac State came from the recently-defunct American West Conference, and total conference membership was nine. 

Similar to the previous year, the top six teams in the regular season conference standings participated in the tournament. The top two  earned byes into the semifinals while the remaining four played in the quarterfinals. The lowest remaining seed met the top seed in the semifinals.

Bracket

NCAA tournament
Montana received the automatic bid to the NCAA tournament, and no other Big Sky members were invited. Seeded sixteenth in the West regional, the Grizzlies lost to defending champion Kentucky in the first round at Salt Lake City.

Northern Arizona was invited to the NIT, but lost in the first round at Arkansas.

See also
American West Conference men's basketball tournament (1995–1996)
Big Sky Conference women's basketball tournament

References

Big Sky Conference men's basketball tournament
Tournament
Big Sky Conference men's basketball tournament
Big Sky Conference men's basketball tournament
College basketball tournaments in Arizona
Flagstaff, Arizona